Robert George may refer to:

Robert George (Canadian admiral) (born 1940), retired officer of the Canadian Forces
Robert George (ice hockey) (1896–1979), French ice hockey player
Robert George (pharmacologist) (1923–2006), American pharmacologist
Sir Robert George (RAF officer) (1896–1967), air force pilot and South Australian Governor
Robert George (rower) (born 1932), Belgian rower
Robert A. George, writer for the New York Post 
Robert P. George (born 1955), Princeton University professor

See also
Bob George (disambiguation)
Bobby George (born 1945), English television presenter and darts player